The Bread Peddler (French:La porteuse de pain, Italian:La portatrice di pane) is a 1963 French-Italian historical drama film directed by Maurice Cloche and starring Suzanne Flon, Philippe Noiret and Jean Rochefort. It is based on the novel of the same title by Xavier de Montépin.

Cast
 Suzanne Flon as Maman Lison / Jeanne Fortier 
 Philippe Noiret as Jacques Garaud / Paul Harmant  
 Jean Rochefort as Ovide Soliveau  
 Jeanne Valérie as Mary Harmant  
 Michel Lemoine as Georges Darier  
 José Greci as Amanda  
 Marie-France Mignal as Lucie  
 Michel Bardinet as Jules Labroue  
 Bernard La Jarrige as Le préfet de police  
 Pierre Doris as Le vendeur de journaux  
 Paul Vervisch as Ricoux  
 Albert Dinan as Le Tourangeau, un boulanger  
 Pierre Mirat as La Brioche  
 Aram Stephan as Le prince 
 Claude Le Lorrain as Perkins  
 Lisette Lebon as Marianne  
 Philippe Castelli as Le premier policier aux ordres du préfet de police 
 Bernard Musson as Le second policier aux ordres du préfet de police 
 Pierre Duncan as L'officier de police  
 Grégoire Gromoff as L'annonceur  
 Max Montavon as Un gendarme  
 Madeleine Suffel as La concierge  
 Pierre Massimi as Lucien Labroue  
 Alberto Lupo as Étienne Castel

See also
The Bread Peddler (1950, also directed by Maurice Cloche)

References

Bibliography 
 Goble, Alan. The Complete Index to Literary Sources in Film. Walter de Gruyter, 1999.

External links 
 

1960s historical drama films
French historical drama films
Italian historical drama films
1963 films
1960s French-language films
Films directed by Maurice Cloche
Films set in the 19th century
Films based on The Bread Peddler
1963 drama films
1950s French films
1950s Italian films
1960s Italian films
1960s French films